Filippov is a Russian surname that is derived from the male given name Filipp and literally means Filipp's. Notable people with the surname include:

Aleksandr Filippov (footballer) (1892–1962), Russian association football player
Aleksei Fedorovich Filippov (1923–2006), Russian mathematician, professor
Aleksei Filippov (footballer born 1973) (born 1973), retired Russian professional footballer
Aleksei Filippov (footballer born 1975) (born 1975), Russian professional football player
Anton Filippov (born 1986), Uzbekistani chess Grandmaster (2008)
Dmitry Filippov (born 1969), Russian handball player
Dmitry Nikolayevich Filippov (1944–1998), Russian-Soviet statesman, political and public figure
Igor Filippov (painter) (born 1961), painter from Sevastopol, Ukraine
Igor Filippov (volleyball) (born 1991), Russian volleyball player
Maksim Filippov (born 1984), Russian professional football player
Maria Filippov (born 1973), Bulgarian ice skater
Mikhail Filippov (born 1992), Russian professional football player
Pyotr Filippov (1893–1965), Russian Soviet football player
Sasha Filippov (1925–1942), spy for the Red Army during the Battle of Stalingrad
Sergei Filippov (footballer, born 1892), Russian association football player
Sergei Filippov (footballer, born 1967), Russian association football player
Vadim Filippov (born 1983), Russian professional football player
Valery Filippov (born 1975), Russian chess grandmaster
Vasily Filippov (born 1981), Russian handball player
Vladimir Filippov (politician) (born 1951), Russian academic and politician
Vladimir Filippov (footballer) (born 1968), Russian professional football coach and former player

See also
Filipo
Filipov, the Bulgarian equivalent
Filipović
Filipovići (disambiguation)
Filipovo (disambiguation)
Filippo
Filippoi

Russian-language surnames
Patronymic surnames
Surnames from given names